Samson Khachatryan (born 15 February 1960) is an Armenian boxer. He competed in the men's bantamweight event at the 1980 Summer Olympics.

References

1960 births
Living people
Armenian male boxers
Olympic boxers of the Soviet Union
Boxers at the 1980 Summer Olympics
People from Vanadzor
Bantamweight boxers